First Midwest Bancorp, Inc was headquartered in Chicago, Illinois, just east of O'Hare Airport. The company's predecessor traces back to Joliet, Illinois. From there the company has grown to serve many Chicago suburbs including northwest Indiana, downstate Illinois, southeast Wisconsin and the Quad Cities area including Iowa. First Midwest Bank is one of the largest banking institutions in the United States

First Midwest Bank provides retail and business banking through more than 125 branches. In 2006, First Midwest acquired Bank Calumet for $307 million in cash, expanding its presence in the northwest Indiana area.

On October 23, 2009, First Midwest Bank acquired certain deposits and loans of Westmont-based First DuPage Bank in a transaction facilitated by the Federal Deposit Insurance Corporation. First Midwest Bank agreed to assume all of the deposits - $230 million, and agreed to purchase approximately $260 million in assets at a discount of $32 million. First Midwest Bank entered into a loss-share transaction with the FDIC providing First Midwest Bank with protection from the FDIC for loan losses.

On April 23, 2010, First Midwest Bank acquired Peotone Bank, taking on $130 million in assets and $127 million in deposits in a transaction facilitated by the Federal Deposit Insurance Corporation.

On August 13, 2010, First Midwest acquired Palos Bank and Trust Company in a transaction facilitated by the Federal Deposit Insurance Corporation. Palos Bank and Trust Company had approximately $493.4 million in total assets and $467.8 million in total deposits, as of June 30, 2010. First Midwest Bank will pay the FDIC a premium of 1.0 percent to assume all of the deposits of Palos Bank and Trust Company. In addition to assuming all of the deposits of the failed bank, First Midwest Bank agreed to purchase essentially all of the assets. The FDIC and First Midwest Bank entered into a loss-share transaction on $343.8 million of Palos Bank and Trust Company's assets.

First Midwest Bank assumed Waukegan Savings Bank's $77 million in deposits and $89 million in assets following its closure by the FDIC. The two Waukegan branches will open as First Midwest locations.

The company acquired naming rights to the First Midwest Bank Amphitheatre in Tinley Park, Illinois.

In 2021, First Midwest announced a merger with Old National Bank, combining the companies assets, retaining the Old National name and maintaining headquarters in Chicago and Evansville. This was finished in February 2022.

References

External links
Official website (Archive)
First Midwest Bancorp, Inc. - SEC Filings

American companies established in 1982
Banks established in 1982
Banks disestablished in 2022
Banks based in Illinois
Defunct banks of the United States
Companies based in DuPage County, Illinois
Itasca, Illinois
Companies formerly listed on the Nasdaq
1982 establishments in the United States
1982 establishments in Illinois
2022 mergers and acquisitions
2022 disestablishments in Illinois